Swarg is a 1990 Indian Hindi-language drama film directed by David Dhawan, released in 1990. It stars Rajesh Khanna, Govinda, Juhi Chawla, Madhavi in lead roles. Swarg is the fourth last certified hit of Rajesh Khanna, as this was followed by Begunaah, Ghar Parivaar and Rupaye Dus Karod in the year 1991.

The movie is loosely based on the 1967 movie Mehrban starring Ashok Kumar, which itself was a remake of the 1960 Tamil movie Padikkadha Medhai which in turn was a remake of 1953 Bengali film Jog Biyog based on the novel of same name by Ashapoorna Devi. Swarg was remade in Telugu as Indra Bhavanam with Krishna and Krishnam Raju, in Odia as Bhai Hela Bhagari Starring Siddhanta Mahapatra And Rachana Banerjee, in Bengali as Annadata and Nepali as Izzatadar , in Bangladesh as Sneher Protidhan. Bengali version was highly appreciated by the audience and was successful in box office. Prosenjit Chatterjee played Shankar, the Govinda role whereas Bangladesh actor Razzak played Mr. Amar Chowdhury, the Rajesh Khanna role and Sreelekha Mitra played Barsha, the Juhi Chawla role in its Bengali version. Swarg was one of the highest grossing films of 1990, and a commercial success.

Plot
Living in a luxurious mansion named Swarg, this is the story of Mr. Kumar or Sahabji a rich businessman and landowner. His family consists of his wife, sister Jyoti, two brothers, Vicky and Ravi, and a sister-in-law. He also has a loyal servant, Krishna, who considers the former akin to a father.

Sahabji has a clash of ideals with Dhanraj, an immoral businessman, regarding a business matter, and Sahabji dissolves the venture. In vengeance, Dhanraj schemes with Sahabji's two brothers to usurp Sahabji's wealth and businesses. He sets fire in Sahabji's factory, citing short circuit as the reason, and takes over the luxurious mansion and vast business empire, leaving Sahabji virtually penniless, and devastated with the passing away of his wife. His brothers have now taken over the money, the mansion, and his business. When Krishna confronted the brothers of his master, he was instead brutally fired by Sahabji himself, because he was charged with stealing Jyoti's necklace by Sahabji's brothers and sister-in-law. Later, he learns that Sahabji intentionally banished him so that he can do something better in life and not be held down Sahabji's own misfortunes. Krishna moves to Bombay and meets a man called Chadda, or Airport, and they become friends.  His hard work in the city makes him a popular film star which enables him to accumulate enough wealth to make him a rich man in the scale of his former master, and he returns to his town after several years as a mysterious but wealthy businessman.

In the guise of a golden offer, Krishna sends Airport to buy Sahabji's mansion - which is now owned by Dhanraj - for the price of 90 lakh INR (USD$529,000), to which the greedy Dhanraj readily agrees and signs over the deeds of ownership of the land and the mansion, unaware of the buyer's actual identity. In the process of storing the cash payment in his personal vault, he is informed his own factory has mysteriously caught fire, causing him to hurry to the site in time to see his factory crumble to ashes. At this point, Krishna confronts him and reveals himself to be the mystery buyer, and also implicitly confesses to being responsible for the "accidental" fire, similar to the scheme Dhanraj perpetrated against Sahabji. Krishna then reminds Dhanraj of him selling the mansion for 90 lakh INR (USD$529,000), and then rhetorically wonders what if Dhanraj were to lose that 90 lakh INR (USD$529,000) as well. True enough, Dhanraj finds his safe empty of the cash upon rushing back, effectively rendering him homeless and ruined.

Krishna then targets Sahabji's brothers by using their greed against them. Without revealing himself, he enters into a business deal with them and later cheats them out of their investments - similar to how they cheated their older brother out of his finances - that renders them penniless and desperate. At this point, Krishna reveals himself to them and informs them that it was all as part of his plan to restore the lost wealth, glory, and fortune of his former master.

Krishna goes to a temple & prays to God so that he meets Sahabji very soon. Incidentally, he finds Sahabji in the same temple and gets to know that both Sahabji and Jyoti are in a pitiable condition. He brings them back to the mansion. Sahabji then witnesses his brothers inside the mansion and demands to know why are they there, Krishna reveals that they've paid for much more than they bid, and were now totally homeless and ruined, and they had also realized their mistake, so he forgave them and brought them back to the mansion. Jyoti, Krishna, and the brothers ask for forgiveness of them (brothers) from Sahabji, which Sahabji outright refuses, after which, their late mother's portrait falls from above, and Shahbji is reminded of the promise he made to her regarding taking care of his brothers no matter what. At this point, Sahabji suffers a cardiac arrest, caused by years of financial, physical, and emotional stress. He forgives his brothers. He also approves Jyoti and Krishna's relationship and gives his blessings to a marriage. With that, the patriarch passes away, leaving all his inheritance to Krishna and Jyoti.

Cast

Rajesh Khanna as Kumar
Govinda as Krishna
Juhi Chawla as Jyoti
Madhavi as Janki 
Paresh Rawal as Dhanraj
Satish Kaushik as Airport
Bharat Kapoor as Nagpal
Raja Bundela as Vikram "Vicky"
Dilip Dhawan as Ravi 
Neena Gupta as Naina
Arun Bakshi as Film Director
Mahesh Anand as Guru
Yunus Parvez as Gardener 
Lilliput as Crippled Beggar on the Street
Om Shivpuri as Himself 
N. Chandra as "Papaji" Director N. Chandra

Music 

The soundtrack of the film contains 5 songs. Lyrics were by Sameer and music was conducted by the award-winning duo Anand–Milind.

References

External links
 

1990 films
Indian drama films
1990s Hindi-language films
Films directed by David Dhawan
Films scored by Anand–Milind
Remakes of Indian films
Hindi films remade in other languages
Films shot in Mumbai
1990 drama films
Hindi-language drama films
Films based on works by Ashapurna Devi